, also written as (145453) 2005 RR43, is a trans-Neptunian object (TNO) estimated to be about 250 km in diameter. It was discovered on 9 September 2005 by Andrew Becker, Andrew Puckett and Jeremy Kubica at Apache Point Observatory in Sunspot, New Mexico.

Origin 

Surface 
The surface is covered by water ice as attested by deep absorption at 1.5 and 2 μm in the infrared spectrum and neutral (i.e. non-red) colour. Scattering models reveal that the observed water ice is, at least in a significant fraction, crystalline and organics, detected on the surface of many TNOs, are completely absent.
These physical and orbital characteristics common with Haumea led to suggestion that  is a member of the Haumea collisional family. The object, together with other members of the family (and ), would be created from ice mantle ejected from the proto-Haumea as result of a collision with another large (around ) body.

See also

References

External links 
 List of TNOs, Minor Planet Center
 (145453) 2005 RR43 Precovery Images
 

Haumea family
Classical Kuiper belt objects
2005 RR43
2005 RR43
2005 RR43
20050909